Plastic Man is a superhero from the Golden Age of Comic Books.

Plastic Man may also refer to:

 "Plastic Man" (song), by the Kinks
 Stacey Augmon (born 1968), retired NBA star, with the nickname Plastic Man
Plastician (born 1982), musician also known as Plasticman
Richie Hawtin (born 1970), musician also known as Plastikman
Plastic Man (The Temptations song), 1973 from their album Masterpiece (The Temptations album)
 "Plastic Man", a song by Seether from Karma and Effect